Stephen Nicholas Emery Egon Fazekas de St Groth is a Hungarian-Australian microbiologist. He completed his education in Hungary and moved to Australia in the 1950s where he researched with Frank Macfarlane Burnet at the Walter and Eliza Hall Institute of Medical Research in Melbourne, and later at the John Curtin School of Medical Research and CSIRO in Canberra.

References
 BrightSparcs. Fazekas de St Groth, Stephen Nicholas Emery Egon

Australian microbiologists
Year of birth missing (living people)
Living people
WEHI alumni